Lake Valley is an unincorporated community and census-designated place in San Juan County, New Mexico, United States. Its population was 64 as of the 2010 census.

Geography

Education 
Its school district is Farmington Municipal Schools.

References

Census-designated places in New Mexico
Census-designated places in San Juan County, New Mexico